The Odyssey Award for Excellence in Audiobook Production is an annual award conferred by the American Library Association upon the publisher of "the best audiobook produced for children and/or young adults, available in English in the United States". It is jointly administered by two ALA divisions (Association for Library Service to Children (ALSC) and Young Adult Library Services Association (YALSA)) and sponsored by Booklist magazine. It recognizes production quality in all respects, considering such things as narration, sound quality, background music and sound effects. It is named for Homer's eighth century BCE epic poem Odyssey, which was transmitted orally, to remind us modern people of the ancient roots of storytelling.

The award was inaugurated in 2008.

For many reasons indicated in the 2008 manifesto, "it is essential for ALSC and YALSA to provide the same level of support for this nonprint format that they have historically provided for print materials, by creating an annual award for the best audiobooks in the field."

Criteria
Source: "Eligibility & Criteria"
 All literary genres are eligible for consideration, including read-alongs.
 The Committee will consider and vote on titles published within their assigned calendar year, January 1 to October 31, in addition to those published between November 1 and December 31 of the previous year. A title may only be submitted once and cannot be reconsidered the next year.
 Audiobooks produced previously in another audio format are ineligible for consideration.
 The audiobook is intended for either young adults or children, who are defined as persons up to and including age 18; works for this entire age range are to be considered. Adult titles are ineligible.
 Audiobooks featuring single or full cast narration are eligible.
 Audiobooks previously published in another country are eligible presuming they have also been distributed in the United States during the term of eligibility. 
 Only audiobooks produced in English are considered, but this requirement does not limit the use of words or phrases in another language where appropriate in context.
 If no title is deemed sufficiently meritorious, no award will be given that year.
 The chair, with assistance from designated ALSC or YALSA staff, is responsible for verifying the eligibility of all nominated titles.
 The award will be presented to the producers of the audiobooks.

Recipients
In each of the fifteen cycles to 2022, at least one title has been named an Honor Audiobook with five being the greatest number of Honors (2008, 2009, 2018) and one being the fewest (2016). Beginning in the 2022 award-year, two titles may be named Winners, one for Excellence in Audiobook Production for Children, and one for Excellence in Audiobook Production for Young Adults.

Multiple awards
Listening Library has won 5 awards and Live Oak Media and Harper have each won 3.

Katherine Kellgren is the narrator of the most Odyssey-honored titles at five Honor Audiobooks, including three written by L. A. Meyer and produced by Listen & Live Audio — the first, second, and fourth Jacky Faber books.

Sherman Alexie, author and narrator of the 2009 Odyssey Award-winning audiobook, The Absolutely True Diary of a Part-Time Indian, also won the annual National Book Award for Young People's Literature for the print edition of that book (Little, Brown Books for Young Readers, September 2007). Jarret J. Krosoczka, who wrote, illustrated, and narrated the 2020 Odyssey-winning audiobook Hey, Kiddo, was a National Book Award for Young People's Literature finalist for the print edition.

See also
 
 :Category:Audiobooks

Notes

References

American children's literary awards
Awards established in 2008
American Library Association awards
Audiobook awards
English-language literary awards
Young adult literature awards